Planète Sauvage (Wild Planet in English) is a zoological park situated in the French Atlantic coast, in Port-Saint-Père near Nantes, in the Loire-Atlantique departement. Founded in 1992 by Monique and Dany Laurent and known as the Safari Africain until 1998, it was then operated by the Compagnie des Alpes between 2005 and 2015. Since that date the park has been the property of the multinational company , whose main shareholder is a Belgian private equity fund of the Groupe Bruxelles Lambert. Its director is Philippe Vignaud.

Since 2008 it receives between 200,000 and 322,000 visitors each year. Although not a member of the EAZA, it cooperates with researchers and finances wildlife conservation NGOs.

It has been at the heart of several controversies since its opening, about a temporary human zoo in 1994, an adjourned dolphinarium project in 1998, the captivity conditions of its dolphins, which three of them have died, since 2007, and the transfer of macaques to a research laboratory practicing vivisection, in 2014.

History
 1992 : Opening of "Safari Africain". There were 500 animals.
 1994 : Opening of an Ivory Coast village. 
 1998 : The "Safari Africain" is renamed Planète Sauvage with a new sea lions show.
 2005 : Planète Sauvage joins the group Compagnie des Alpes, European leader of the family entertainment.
 2006 : Creation of the « bivouac au safari ».
 2008 : Exhibition "Planète Fragile : Fragile beauty from earth"
 2009 : Opening of "Cité marine" a dolphinarium where five dolphins live.

The different parts of the park

The Safari Track
The safari trail is divided into 15 parts where  giraffes, lions, wolves, bears, elephants, impalas and much more can be seen. The zoo is currently home to four elephants.

Visitors can also take the "4x4 Off Road Adventure" led by a guide that will get them even closer to the animals.

The pedestrian part

There are different parts:

 The bush village and the ark of reptiles: The adventure continues on foot through the bush village, an authentic reconstruction of a village in Senufo country in Ivory Coast. At the bend of the straw huts there are unusual encounters with small animals such as meerkats, otters and raccoons. The ark that houses reptiles, crocodiles and other "curiosities" lies at the heart of the village.
 The island of flamingos and jungle route: It is in a landscaped area that was a colony of flamingos. Alleys shaded jungle trail leading to the territory of a tribe of monkeys.
 The Marine City: Since November 2008, five dolphins swim at the heart of the four new pools of Marine City. After the welfare of animals, the team has three objectives: to educate, study and protect. In avril 2020, the park have 9 dolphins : Lucy (F), Péos (M), Amtan (F), Ocean (M), Parel (F), Galéo (M), Amani (M), Nouma (M) and Kuma (M).

The "Bivouac"
The adventure can continue at the bivouac. This service includes a 4x4 off-road trip to attend the return of the animals, dinner at the campfire, a night spent near the animals, and a breakfast.

Research
Planète Sauvage is a park that is involved in different research programs. In partnership with recognized scientists organisations (the CNRS, the University of Rennes ethology), the park is studying communication whistled in the dolphin and the social factors that influence it.

Conservation

Controversy 
In 1994, Planète Sauvage tried to open an "African village" attraction with men and women who, by contract, were to be topless when the weather permitted. Sponsored by Biscuiterie Saint-Michel as part of the promotion for their "Bamboula" cookies, the Cote d'Ivoirian village, rebuilt at Port-Saint-Père, was labeled "Bamboula Village" after the eponymous children's character. Public outcry led to cancellation of the project, as it was judged to come too close to being a "human zoo".

Notes

External links
 
 

Zoos in France
Safari parks
Compagnie des Alpes
Buildings and structures in Loire-Atlantique
Tourist attractions in Loire-Atlantique
1992 establishments in France
Zoos established in 1992
Organizations based in Pays de la Loire